Martin Pedersen (born 15 April 1983) is a Danish former professional road bicycle racer. He retired after the 2013 season.

Major results

2003
 1st  Madison, National Track Championships
2002
 1st  Road race, National Under-23 Road Championships
2004
 1st  Road race, National Under-23 Road Championships
 4th Giro del Canavese
2005
 1st Liège–Bastogne–Liège U23
 Olympia's Tour
1st Points classification
1st Stages 2 & 3
 1st Stage 2 Giro della Toscana
 1st Stage 1, 2 & 4 Ringerike GP
 1st GP San Giuseppe
2006
 1st  Overall Tour of Britain
1st Stage 1
2007
 1st  Mountains classification, Eneco Tour
 5th Sparkassen Giro Bochum
 9th Reading Classic
2008
 1st Omloop van het Houtland
 1st Stage 4b Okolo Slovenska
 1st Stage 2 Circuit des Ardennes International
 2nd Overall Kreiz Breizh Elites
1st Stage 1
 2nd GP Nordjylland
 7th Grand Prix Cristal Energie
 10th Overall Ringerike GP
2009
 1st Rund um Köln
 1st Grand Prix de la Ville de Nogent-sur-Oise
 1st Grand Prix Cristal Energie
 2nd GP Stad Zottegem
 3rd Overall Les 3 Jours de Vaucluse
1st Stage 3
 3rd Trophée des Champions
 4th Route Adélie
 5th Road race, National Road Championships
 6th Les Boucles du Sud Ardèche
 7th Overall Boucles de la Mayenne
 7th Scandinavian Race Uppsala
 9th Overall Ringerike GP
2012
 1st  Overall Tour of China I
1st Stage 1 (TTT)
 9th Grand Prix of Donetsk
2013
 1st Circuit d'Alger
 3rd Overall Tour de Tipaza
 9th Race Horizon Park II

References

External links
Team CSC profile
Palmares at Cycling Base (French)

Danish male cyclists
1983 births
Living people
People from Brøndby Municipality
Sportspeople from the Capital Region of Denmark